Mabey may refer to:

Mabey (surname)
Mabey Group a British privately owned global engineering company
Mabey Logistic Support Bridge, used by the military

See also
Maybe (disambiguation)